The 15th Gaudí Awards ceremony, organised by the Catalan Film Academy, were held on 22 January 2023 at the MNAC's Oval Room.

Background 
The awards added three new categories, namely that of Best New Director, Best Adapted Screenplay, and a non-gendered acting award for the Best New Performance. In the wake of Agustí Villaronga's death, Catalan Film Academy president Judith Colell announced changes in the gala in order to pay homage to the filmmaker, who helmed signature Catalan pictures such as Black Bread or Uncertain Glory.

Winners and nominees 

The winners and nominees are listed as follows:

Honorary Gaudí Award

Public Choice's Special Award 
 ''Alcarràs

References

External links
 Official website

Gaudí Awards
G
2023 in Catalonia